Erastria decrepitaria is a species of geometrid moth in the family Geometridae. It is found in Central America, North America, and South America.

The MONA or Hodges number for Erastria decrepitaria is 6702.

Subspecies
These two subspecies belong to the species Erastria decrepitaria:
 Erastria decrepitaria decrepitaria
 Erastria decrepitaria esperanza Barnes & McDunnough, 1916

References

Further reading

 

Caberini
Articles created by Qbugbot
Moths described in 1823